Coteaux de Pierrevert is a wine-growing AOC in the western part of the Provence wine region of France, where the wines are produced in 11 communes of the Alpes-de-Haute-Provence département. It is partly  located in the valley of the Durance river in the region of Manosque which is the northern part of Provence, it  is considered by the INAO however, to be an eastern extremity of the southern Rhône Valley.

Wines
Red wines are made from Grenache noir and Syrah which  must  account for 70% together with  a minimum of 30% of each. Secondary  varieties are Cinsault, Mourvedre and Carignan.
Rosé: Grenache noir minimum 50%, and Syrah 20% minimum. Other secondary varieties are allowed with  a maximum of 20% white grapes.
White wines from Clairette blanche, Grenache blanc, Ugni blanc, Roussanne of which no  variety may exceed 70% together to a maximum of 20%. Grenache blanc and Vermentino must together represent a minimum of 25%.
Rosés and whites should be consumed soon after bottling, while the reds can age up  to a maximum of five years .

Economy
The Coteaux de Pierrevert wines are produced by a total of 35 concerns which include 32 growers, 6 private wineries, 2 cooperative wineries, and one producer/merchant.

The vineyards are in the communes of Corbières, Gréoux-les-Bains, Manosque, Montfuron, Pierrevert, Quinson, Saint-Laurent-du-Verdon, Saint-Martin-de-Brômes, Sainte-Tulle, Villeneuve, and Volx.

See also
French wine

References

Provence wine AOCs
Alpes-de-Haute-Provence